Dennis D. McCarthy is a former Director of Time at the United States Naval Observatory. McCarthy also works for the International Earth Rotation and Reference Systems Service.

References

Living people
Year of birth missing (living people)
American scientists